A turnstile (also called a turnpike, gateline, baffle gate, automated gate, turn gate in some regions) is a form of gate which allows one person to pass at a time. A turnstile can be configured to enforce one-way human traffic. In addition, a turnstile can restrict passage only to people who insert a coin, ticket, pass, or other method of payment.  Modern turnstiles can incorporate biometrics, including retina scanning, fingerprints, and other individual human characteristics which can be scanned. Thus a turnstile can be used in the case of paid access (sometimes called a faregate or ticket barrier when used for this purpose), for example to access public transport, a pay toilet, or to restrict access to authorized people, for example in the lobby of an office building.

History

Turnstiles were originally used, like other forms of stile, to allow human beings to pass while keeping sheep or other livestock penned in. The use of turnstiles in most modern applications has been credited to Clarence Saunders, who used them in his first Piggly Wiggly store.

Applications

Turnstiles are used at a wide variety of settings, including stadiums, amusement parks, mass transit stations, office lobbies, airports, ski resorts, factories, power plants and casinos.

From a business/revenue standpoint, turnstiles give an accurate, verifiable count of attendance. From a security standpoint, they lead patrons to enter single-file, so security personnel have a clear view of each patron. This enables security to efficiently isolate potential trouble or to confiscate any prohibited materials. On the other hand, physical barriers become a serious safety issue when a speedy evacuation is needed, requiring emergency exits that bypass any turnstiles.

Persons with disabilities may have difficulties using turnstiles. In these cases, generally a wide aisle gate or a manual gate may be provided. At some locations where luggage is expected, a line of turnstiles may be entirely formed of wide aisle gates, for example at Heathrow Terminals 2 & 3 Underground station.

Turnstiles often use ratchet mechanisms to allow the rotation of the stile in one direction allowing ingress but preventing rotation in the other direction. They are often designed to operate only after a payment has been made, usually by inserting a coin or token in a slot; or by swiping, tapping, or inserting a paper ticket or electronically-encoded card.

Turnstiles are often used for counting the numbers of people passing through a gate, even when payment is not involved. They are used extensively in this manner in amusement parks, in order to keep track of how many people enter and exit the park and ride each ride. The first major use of turnstiles at a sporting venue was at Hampden Park in Glasgow, Scotland.

Types

Waist-high
Waist-high turnstiles are often used in fairs, attractions, and arenas. The user inserts a ticket or pass into the slot, from which a barcode is read; if access is to be granted, a sensor determines the speed with which the user passes through, and sets the electric motor to turn the turnstile at the corresponding speed.
Sometimes also referred to as "half-height" turnstiles, this fixed arm style has traditionally been the most popular type of turnstile. There are many variations of this style available, including one which is designed to be accompanied by a matching ticket box, and one with a ticket box built in. Some styles are designed to allow entry only after a payment (actual coins and tokens) are inserted, while others allow access after a valid barcode is electronically read.
A disadvantage to this type is people can "jump the turnstile" as happens commonly on the Moscow Metro and other mass transport systems in Russia.

Wall mount tripod turnstile
The wall mount tripod turnstiles are suitable for places where installation on ground becomes impossible. The turnstile is directly fixed to the wall and all functions are achieved. Such turnstiles are usually used in narrow lanes and where wall installation is more feasible.

Optical

Optical turnstiles are an alternative to the traditional "arm"-style turnstile and are increasingly used in locations where a physical barrier is deemed unnecessary or unaesthetic. Optical turnstiles generally use an infrared beam to count patrons and recognize anyone attempting to enter a site without a valid entry pass.

Drop-arm optical

The drop-arm optical turnstile is a combination of the security of a tripod or barrier turnstile and a fully optical turnstile. The lanes can have either single or double arms. When access is granted the arms drop into recesses in the cabinet. Once the arms drop out of the way, the turnstile functions as a fully optical turnstile.

Full-height turnstiles 
Beyond this, full-height turnstiles often offer better security because they cannot be climbed over or ducked under, and can be designed to lock after each person enters so that the following person must pay a fee or present credentials. They may be designed to allow traffic in both directions, or in a single direction. It is sometimes called a "Rotogate", especially in Chicago, where it is used at unstaffed exits of Chicago 'L' stations, and is also used increasingly in New York City Subway stations since the turn of the 21st century.

See also 
 Optical turnstile
 Stile
 Revolving door
 Toll road
 Turnstile (symbol)

Notes

References

External links 

Page showing various designs of turnstiles in the history of the New York subway system.

Fare collection systems
Types of gates
Access control